The governor of Negros Oriental is the local chief executive and head of the Provincial Government of Negros Oriental. Along with the Governor of Negros Occidental and the Mayor of the highly urbanized city of Bacolod, he sits as one of the chief executives of Negros Island.

Formation
Before independence, the position had been occupied by appointed Spanish military commanders that also serve the role of Governor since the transfer of the capital to Bacolod in 1849. Previously, the local chief executive post was vested on the "Corregidor," or the commander of the military outpost, in the two previous capitals of Ilog, Negros Occidental and Himamaylan. When the island was divided into two provinces, the Military Governor designated Dumaguete as the provincial capital.

After the Negros Revolution, all provincial authority divested on the Office of the President and Vice President, representing Negros Occidental and Negros Oriental. Americans occupied the fledgling republic and requested the provisional government to conduct an island-wide election for the gubernatorial post. Melecio Severino of Silay emerged as the first elected governor for the whole island. But upon the dissolution of the republic, Demetrio Larena, the former Vice-President of the Republic of Negros was appointed Governor.

Duties and related offices
By the convention set for the newly-created Negros Island Region, the Governor of Negros Oriental sits as chairperson of one of the two regional councils, namely the Regional Development Council and the Regional Peace and Order Council.

List of governors

Spanish governors of Negros province
From the formal establishment of the military outpost in the pueblo of Ilog until the promulgation of a royal decree dividing the island into Negros Occidental and Negros Oriental on October 25, 1889, Negros Island was governed as a single province starting from being under the jurisdiction of Oton, Iloilo until it established its capitals in Ilog (1734), Himamaylan (1795) and Bacolod (1849).

Spanish governors of Negros Oriental
Governor General Valeriano Wéyler promulgated a royal decree in October 25, 1889, which divided the island into two provinces, namely Negros Occidental and Negros Oriental, upon the request of the 13 Augustinian Recollect friars administering the towns east of the island. Bacolod was retained as the capital of Negros Occidental.

Revolutionary government
Negros Island was briefly unified temporarily upon the assumption of the Revolutionary Government in Bacolod. An election for separate provincial officials was planned but not implemented until 1901, under the American protectorate period of the Republic of Negros.

Filipino governors
This list includes governors appointed or elected since the end of Spanish rule, the recognized start of the institutional office.

Notes

References

Governors of Negros Oriental
Governors of provinces of the Philippines